The Ministry of Trade (Indonesian: Kementerian Perdagangan) is a ministry of the Government of Indonesia that directs the formulation of policies related to the development of trade in Indonesia.

Organization Structure 

Based on Presidential Decree No. 48/2015, Ministry of Trade is organized into the following:
 Secretariat General
 Directorate General of Domestic Trade
 Directorate General of Consumer Protection and Trade Order
 Directorate General of Foreign Trade
 Directorate General of International Trade Cooperation
 Directorate General of National Export Development
 Inspectorate General
 Commodity Futures Trading Supervisory Agency
 Trade Policy Analysis and Development Agency
 4 Experts

References

External links 

 Homepage

Trade
Indonesia